The 1948 Indiana Hoosiers football team represented the Indiana Hoosiers in the 1948 Big Nine Conference football season. They participated as members of the Big Nine Conference. The Hoosiers played their home games at Memorial Stadium in Bloomington, Indiana. The team was coached by Clyde B. Smith, in his first year as head coach of the Hoosiers.

Schedule

1949 NFL draftees

References

Indiana
Indiana Hoosiers football seasons
Indiana Hoosiers football